Pre-decimal Australian coins arose when the Federation of Australia gave the constitutional power to Commonwealth of Australia to mint its own coinage in 1901. The new power allowed the Commonwealth to issue legal tender rather than individually through the six former British self-governing colonies of Queensland, New South Wales, Victoria, Tasmania, South Australia, and Western Australia.

However, with the adoption of a Federal government in Australia, British coins continued to be used until 1910 when the first Australian silver coins were introduced. These new coins, which included florins, shillings, sixpences and threepences, were all minted with a portrait of Edward VII. A year later Australian pennies and half-pennies entered circulation. In 1931 gold sovereigns stopped being minted in Australia. A crown or five-shilling coin was minted in 1937 and 1938.

Coinage of the Australian pound was replaced by decimalised coins of the Australian dollar on 14 February 1966. The conversion rate was A$2 = A£1.

Australian £sd 
In 1898 the British government allowed two colonies, New South Wales and Victoria, to mint silver and bronze coins at their mints in Sydney and Melbourne respectively.

Debasement
In 1946, due to costs incurred during World War II, the silver content of the coins was reduced from 0.925 to 0.500 of the coin weight, which lasted until decimalisation on 14 February 1966.
One coin highly sought-after by collectors is the 1930 penny.

Coins

Pre-decimal commemorative coins

Florin = 2 shillings

References

General references

External links 

 Cruzi's Coins 
 Guide to predecimal coins
 History of Australian coins
 Australia's first coins – State Library of NSW
 Commonwealth Pre-Decimal Currency
 Australian Pre-Decimal Currency
 Coins from Australia – Online Coin Club

Coins of Australia
Australian pound